Virbia tenuicincta is a moth in the family Erebidae first described by George Hampson in 1901. It is found in Peru.

References

tenuicincta
Moths described in 1901